Gonzalo Rubén Castillejos (born 5 March 1986 in Leones) is an Argentine footballer, who plays as a forward.

Club career

Rosario Central
Castillejos, begun his playing career with Rosario Central of the Argentine Primera División. He made his debut on 31 August 2007 in a 1–1 home draw with Olimpo. He scored his first goal for the club on 8 September 2009 in a 2–1 home win against River Plate.

Lanús
In January 2010, the striker signed for Lanús, that paid around 2 million US dollars. He scored two goals on his debut to help Lanús to come back to win 3–2 against Huracán on their opening fixture of the 2010 Clausura. The next weekend he scored one goal versus Boca Juniors, but his team lost 1–3 that night. On 7 April Lanús was losing 0–1 against Chacarita Juniors, but Castillejos scored 2 goals in the last 4 minutes of the match.

References

External links
 
 BDFA profile 
 Argentine Primera statistics  
 

1986 births
Living people
Sportspeople from Córdoba Province, Argentina
Argentine footballers
Association football forwards
Argentine Primera División players
Primera Nacional players
Ecuadorian Serie A players
Super League Greece players
Rosario Central footballers
Club Atlético Lanús footballers
Barcelona S.C. footballers
Argentinos Juniors footballers
Ferro Carril Oeste footballers
Apollon Smyrnis F.C. players
San Martín de San Juan footballers
Gimnasia y Esgrima de Jujuy footballers
Instituto footballers
Argentine expatriate footballers
Expatriate footballers in Ecuador
Expatriate footballers in Greece
Argentine expatriate sportspeople in Ecuador
Association football midfielders
Argentine expatriate sportspeople in Greece